XVG may refer to:
 The file format used by data visualization software Grace
 The code of Longville Municipal Airport
 XV Gymnasium, a high school in Zagreb, Croatia